The MLB (Year#) series, is a series of Major League Baseball video games by Sony Computer Entertainment published under their 989 Sports label. The series was originally developed by Sony Interactive Studios America, who later became 989 Studios until eventually merging into Sony Computer Entertainment America. Following the merge the games were released under the 989 Sports brand up until 2006. Following that, MLB games from SCEA were released by San Diego Studio under the MLB: The Show series.

Games

See also

 ESPN Baseball Tonight, Sony's 16-bit predecessor
 MLB Pennant Race, Sony's PlayStation predecessor to the 989 Sports baseball series
 MLB 06: The Show, Sony's successor to the 989 Sports baseball series

References

Sony Interactive Entertainment franchises
Major League Baseball video games
Video game franchises introduced in 1997
 
PlayStation (console) games
PlayStation (console)-only games
Video games developed in the United States